Cadbury Dairy Milk is a British brand of milk chocolate manufactured by Cadbury. It was introduced in the United Kingdom in 1905 and now consists of a number of products. Every product in the Dairy Milk line is made with exclusively milk chocolate. In 2014, Dairy Milk was ranked the best-selling chocolate bar in the UK. It is manufactured and distributed by the Hershey Company in the United States under licence from Cadbury. The chocolate is now available in many countries, including China, India, Sri Lanka, Pakistan, the Philippines, Indonesia, Kazakhstan and Bangladesh.

History 

In June 1905, in Birmingham, England, George Cadbury Jr made Cadbury's first Dairy Milk bar, with a higher proportion of milk than previous chocolate bars; by 1914, it would become the company's best-selling product. Through its development, the bar was variously called 'Highland Milk', 'Jersey' and 'Dairy Maid'. Accounts on the origin of the Dairy Milk name differ; it has been suggested that the name change came about on the advice of a shopkeeper in Plymouth, but Cadbury maintains that a customer's daughter came up with the name. Fruit and Nut was introduced as part of the Dairy Milk line in 1926, soon followed by Whole Nut in 1930. By this point, Cadbury's was the brand leader in the United Kingdom. Almost a century on it has retained this position, with Dairy Milk ranking as the best-selling chocolate bar in the UK in 2014. In 2020, Dairy Milk was the second most popular snack overall in the UK behind McVitie's Chocolate Digestive biscuits.

In 1928, Cadbury's introduced the "glass and a half" slogan to accompany the Dairy Milk
bar, to advertise the bar's higher milk content. In the early 2010s, Cadbury made the decision to change the shape of the bar chunks to a more circular shape which also reduced the weight.

Since 2007, Cadbury, has had a trademark in the United Kingdom for the distinctive purple colour (Pantone 2865C) of its chocolate bar wrappers, originally introduced in 1914 as a tribute to Queen Victoria. In October 2013, however, an appeal by Nestlé succeeded in overturning that court ruling.

In July 2018, Cadbury announced it would launch a new Dairy Milk version with 30% less sugar. The chief nutritionist of Public Health England, Alison Tedstone, said she was "pleased that Mondelez is the latest … name" to offer "healthier" products.

Product

The original Dairy Milk bar ("with a glass and a half of fresh milk") was launched in 1905.

Variant bars include Caramel, "Fruit & Nut" (a bar with raisins and almonds), "Whole Nut" (with hazelnuts), "Dairy Milk Silk" and a bar with a Turkish delight centre. Dairy Milk Ritz, a bar with salty Ritz crackers was launched in the United Kingdom in 2014. Alongside this new bar, Dairy Milk with LU biscuits was also launched. The 1970s television advertising campaign for the "Whole Nut" featured a series of commercials with the tag line "Nuts, whole hazelnuts. Ooh! Cadbury's taken them and they cover them in chocolate".

A Vegemite flavoured bar, which consists of milk chocolate, caramel, and Vegemite (5%), was launched in Australia in 2015.

In 1986, the glass and a half symbol appeared on the front of the Irish Dairy Milk wrapper.

Ingredients and tastes for local markets
According to a 2007 report in The New York Times, a British bar contained (in order) milk, sugar, cocoa mass, cocoa butter, vegetable fat and emulsifiers, whilst the American version manufactured by Hershey started its list of ingredients with sugar. It also listed lactose, emulsifier soy lecithin, and "natural and artificial flavorings". Cadbury supplied its chocolate crumb to Hershey, which then added cocoa butter during processing. According to its spokesman, Cadbury tries to adapt the taste of the product to that which local consumers are accustomed, meaning it is more akin to a Hershey bar for the US market.

There is a variation of taste between the UK Cadbury-produced products and the equivalents produced by Irish Cadbury; the same can be said for locally produced Cadbury products elsewhere in the world.

Advertising

Pre-2007 advertising
Cadbury's Fruit & Nut was advertised in a popular 1970s television advertisement that featured humourist Frank Muir singing "Everyone's a fruit and nutcase" to the tune of "Danse des mirlitons" from Tchaikovsky's ballet The Nutcracker.

In Ireland, Cadbury Dairy Milk used the jingle "The Perfect Word For Chocolate" from 1986 to 1988. Between 1989 and 1996, the popular jingle "The Choice Is Yours The Taste Is Cadbury" with the slogan "Mysteries of Love" was a well-known advertisement. The song "Show Me Heaven" was used in a 1996 advert, with the jingle "Tastes Like Heaven".

Cadbury has always tried to keep a strong association with milk, with slogans such as "a glass and a half of full cream milk in every half pound" and advertisements that feature a glass of milk pouring out and forming the bar.

In 2004, Cadbury started a series of television advertisements in the United Kingdom and Ireland featuring a human and an animal (representing the human's happiness) debating whether to eat one of a range of included bars.

Glass and a Half Full Productions (2007–2011)

In 2007, Cadbury launched a new advertising campaign entitled Gorilla, from a new in-house production company called "Glass And A Half Full Productions". The advert was premièred during the season finale of Big Brother 2007, and consists of a gorilla at a drum kit, drumming along to the Phil Collins song "In the Air Tonight". The advert has over twenty million views on YouTube, and put the Phil Collins song back into the UK charts.

On 28 March 2008, the second Dairy Milk advert produced by Glass and a Half Full Productions aired. The ad, entitled 'Trucks' features several trucks at night on an empty runway at an airport racing to the tune of Queen's "Don't Stop Me Now". The ad campaign ran at the same time as the problems at Heathrow Terminal 5 with baggage handling; in the advert baggage was scattered across the runway.

On 5 September 2008, the Gorilla advert was relaunched with a new soundtrack – Bonnie Tyler's "Total Eclipse of the Heart" – a reference to online mash-ups of the commercial. Similarly, a version of the truck advert appeared, using Bon Jovi's song "Livin' on a Prayer". Both remakes premiered once again during the finale of Big Brother 2008.

In January 2009, 'Eyebrows', the third advert in the series, was released, of two children moving their eyebrows up and down rapidly to the song "Don't Stop the Rock" by Freestyle. The ad starred Bradley Ford and Leah McArdle.

In April 2010, a fourth advert aired, entitled 'Chocolate Charmer', containing a scientist mixing milk and chocolate to make a dairy milk bar to the tune of "The Only One I Know" by The Charlatans. This was different from the others in that it did not feature the 'A Glass and a Half Full Production' title card at the start.

In April 2011, a fifth advert aired, known as 'Charity Shop' or 'Dancing Clothes', featuring dancing clothes at a charity shop to the tune of "We Don't Have to Take Our Clothes Off" by Jermaine Stewart. This exposed the song to a new generation who downloaded the track and returned the song to the UK Top 40 so far reaching no. 29. This advert marked the return of the Glass and a Half Full title card.

Glass and a Half Full Records

A new 'record label' was launched as part of the Glass and a Half Full Productions campaign. The first song released was Zingolo featuring Tinny, to promote Fairtrade Dairy Milk. A full music video was made incorporating the 60-second ads, as well as a Facebook page.

Joyville (2012–2014)
The 2012–2014 Joyville campaign focused on an 'organisation made to bring joy to people'. Chocolate fountains were put in shopping centres such as Westfield London and the first ad focused on the relaunch of Dairy Milk Bubbly. During the campaign in 2012, Cadbury Dairy Milk was launched in new flavours such as Toffee Popcorn, Golden Biscuit Crunch (an exclusive to Sainsbury's), Nutty Caramel and also Cadbury Dairy Milk with Oreo. Along with the new flavours, Cadbury also launched two new Bubbly bars including a mini version and a Mint Bubbly. Cadbury has also launched Crispello and, most recently, launched "Marvellous Creations" in the UK.

In addition, Cadbury also brought the Joyville concept into Asia, where Singapore bloggers were invited to join in the campaign in 2013.

Free The Joy (2014)
In 2014, Joyville was replaced with the "Free The Joy" campaign.  The song in a television advert is "Yes Sir, I Can Boogie" by Baccara. A new design was launched for Dairy Milk (and its variants) inviting consumers to scan an on-pack QR code and visit a website featuring "Free The Joy" moments.

Marketing in India 

Initially, the company had appointed Amitabh Bachchan as the brand ambassador in 2004. However, the brand soon faced a significant backlash, with worms being spotted in a few of the chocolate bars. With its new campaigns, the company recovered again, with increased sales. One campaign that promoted the product by using the country's love for cricket was successful. The advert was noted to be the best advertisement made in India by The Times of India.
Another famous campaign hosted by the company in the past was the 'Shubh Aarambh' Campaign. This campaign made use of the traditional practice of Indian households of having something sweet before every auspicious occasion. This campaign was successful, and positioned Cadbury Dairy Milk chocolates as part of a family name. Cadbury today holds 70% of the market share of the chocolate industry in the country.

Grey imports
In 2015, Hershey's blocked imports of overseas-made Cadbury chocolate and other confectionery to the US that infringed on its trademark licensing in a settlement with a grey importer. British Dairy Milk has been blind taste-tested as providing a creamier taste and texture, with the Hershey's-made chocolate reportedly leaving a less pleasing coating on the tongue and a somewhat stale aftertaste.

Recalls
Cadbury was fined  in July 2007 due to its products having been found to have been at risk of infection with salmonella (at a factory in Marlbrook, Herefordshire, England).  It spent a further £30 million decontaminating the factory.

On 14 September 2007, Cadbury Schweppes investigated a manufacturing error over allergy warnings, recalling for the second time in two years thousands of chocolate bars.  A printing mistake at the Keynsham factory resulted in the omission of nut allergy labels from 250g Dairy Milk Double Chocolate bars.

The 2008 Chinese milk scandal affected Cadbury, when much of the Cadbury Dairy Milk manufactured in mainland China was tainted with melamine.  Although it can be safely used in plastic manufacturing, melamine is toxic, particularly to infants.

In 2003 worms were found in the chocolate bars in India. Widespread outrage brought by the state media halted production for a few days. Amitabh Bachchan, who was then the Brand ambassador, was also not spared.

See also
 List of chocolate bar brands

References

External links

 

Products introduced in 1905
Chocolate bars
British confectionery
Dairy Milk
The Hershey Company brands
Fair trade brands
Mondelez International brands